You Are the Life (German: Du bist das Leben) is a 1921 German silent film directed by Franz Eckstein and starring Erna Morena, Uschi Elleot and Lya De Putti.

The film's sets were designed by the art director Artur Gunther.

Cast
 Erna Morena 
 Uschi Elleot 
 Lya De Putti 
 Olga Engl 
 Werner Funck 
 Ernst Pittschau

References

Bibliography
 Bock, Hans-Michael & Bergfelder, Tim. The Concise CineGraph. Encyclopedia of German Cinema. Berghahn Books, 2009.

External links

1921 films
Films of the Weimar Republic
Films directed by Franz Eckstein
German silent feature films
German black-and-white films
National Film films